The European Union's Animal By-Products Regulations (Regulation No 1069/2009) allows for the treatment of some animal by-products in composting and biogas plants (anaerobic digesters). The following article describes procedures required to allow solid outputs (compost, digestate) from composting plants and anaerobic digesters onto land in the United Kingdom.

Categories of Animal By-Products 

Category 1: Very high risk
Category 2: High risk
Category 3: Low risk

Category 1 
BSE (Bovine spongiform encephalopathy) carcasses and suspects
Specified Risk Material
Catering waste from international transport

Must all be destroyed, not for use in composting or biogas plants

Category 2 
Condemned meat
Manure and gut contents

Can be used in composting and biogas plants after rendering (133C, 3 bar pressure)
Manure and gut contents only can be used after pretreatment

Category 3 
Catering waste from households, restaurants
Former food
Much slaughter house waste e.g. waste blood & feathers

Can be used in composting and biogas plants without pretreatment

Treatment Standards

Composting 

Closed reactor
 Maximum particle size 40cm, minimum temperature 60C, minimum time at that temperature 2 days
 Maximum Particle size 6cm, minimum temperature 70C, minimum time at that temperature 1 hour

Housed windrow
Particle size 40cm, minimum temperature 60C, minimum time at that temperature 8 days

Biogas plants 

Maximum particle size 5cm, minimum temperature 57C, minimum time at that temperature 5 hours
Maximum particle size 6cm, minimum temperature 70C, minimum time at that temperature 1 hour

References 

http://eur-lex.europa.eu/LexUriServ/LexUriServ.do?uri=OJ:L:2009:300:0001:0033:EN:PDF

http://eur-lex.europa.eu/legal-content/EN/TXT/?qid=1408379493755&uri=CELEX:32011R0749

Notes

Further reading 

Leoci, R., Animal by-products (ABPs): origins, uses, and European regulations, Mantova: Universitas Studiorum, 2014.

See also 
Anaerobic digestion
Biodegradable waste
Composting
Pasteurization

Biodegradable waste management
Waste legislation in the United Kingdom
Waste legislation in the European Union
Agricultural law